Iraq at a Distance: What Anthropologists Can Teach Us about the War is a book length collection of studies by six anthropologists, which provides insight into the impact of the Iraq War on Iraqi citizens since 2003. The book is edited by Antonius C. G. M. Robben and published by the University of Pennsylvania Press in 2009.

See also
Fieldwork Under Fire: Contemporary Studies of Violence and Survival

References

Anthropology books
Books about military history
Iraq War books
2009 non-fiction books
University of Pennsylvania Press books